Alexandra Rebecca Parks (born 26 July 1984) is an English singer-songwriter. Parks was entered into the BBC Television programme, Fame Academy by her father. It was a show that she went on to win. Soon after winning Fame Academy, she released her first album entitled Introduction, which went double platinum in the United Kingdom and gold in several other European countries. In 2005 she released her second album, Honesty.
Parks was dropped by her label, Polydor, on 8 February 2006. Parks stated that the move was a mutual decision and that things had not worked out.

Biography
Alex Parks was born in July 1984 and was raised in the village of Mount Hawke, Cornwall. She is the youngest of four siblings. Parks attended college at The Hub in St Austell.

Parks began fronting a local band, One Trick Pony, which performed mostly cover songs by artists such as Joni Mitchell, Ani Di Franco and Michelle Branch. For two years they played in bars around Cornwall, but the momentum of the band gradually ran down, leaving Parks in her bedroom with a four-track tape machine and a bunch of her own songs-in-progress.

Parks initially planned to move to Amsterdam to learn the art of clowning, but her career path changed when her father submitted an application for the second season of the BBC Television series, Fame Academy.

Parks is gay and before entering Fame Academy had a long-term girlfriend from Newquay.

Fame Academy
Having been prompted by her father to take part in auditions for the show, which threw her in amongst 12,000 hopefuls, the 18-year-old Alex found herself the youngest student chosen for the two-month stay at Witanhurst House in north London.

The final showdown between Parks and Alistair Griffin was screened live and generated so many angry messages from viewers after Daniel Bedingfield who duetted with both finalists, made his feelings clear by urging viewers that they should "just vote for Alex". This outburst by Bedingfield led to claims of favouritism. The BBC was forced to close down the Points of View message boards as negative messages flooded the board. Bedingfield made a public apology to Griffin for his behaviour and outburst. The actual voting figures have never been publicly released. Parks went on to win the show.

Recording career
Her song "Maybe That's What It Takes" was released on 17 November 2003 and peaked at number 3 in the UK Singles Chart the following week. Her debut album Introduction was subsequently released and sold over 500,000 copies. She expressed an interest in a recording career.

Honesty was eventually released in October 2005, preceded by the lead single, "Looking For Water", in October 2005. The album peaked at No. 24 in the UK Albums Chart.

After being dropped by her label, Polydor, Parks wrote a statement to her fans on her official website stating that she had almost no support from the media – hardly any coverage on the radio, TV or in the press and that she was disappointed in how things had turned out. She was not sure whether she was not promoted well enough because they did not like her music, her personally or the fact she had become famous via a reality TV programme.

In 2013, she told her fans she would like to be known as Lexi and said she hoped to be recording again by the end of the year. In 2014, she was spotted at Music Sales Film & TV Songwriters Week in London with Joe McElderry from The X Factor.

Parks has been inactive in music since 2006.

Discography

Studio albums

Singles

1 On downloads only

See also

 List of singer-songwriters
 List of people from Cornwall
 List of gay, lesbian or bisexual people: P-Q
 List of Polydor Records artists
 List of performers on Top of the Pops

References

External links
 Feature articles
 Guardian interview, November 2003
 Scotsman interview, November 2003

 Reviews
 Shakenstir – Introduction review
 Guardian Unlimited – Introduction review
 Playlouder – Introduction review
 Shakenstir – Honesty review
 musicOHM.com – Honesty review
 BBC Pop/Chart Reviews – Honesty review
 Shakenstir – Shepherds Bush Empire gig review, February 2006
 Shakenstir – Special Awards for 2006, December 2006

1984 births
Living people
English women singer-songwriters
English lesbian musicians
English LGBT singers
English LGBT songwriters
People from Cornwall
Star Academy winners
21st-century English women singers
Lesbian singers
Lesbian songwriters
20th-century LGBT people
21st-century LGBT people